Verina Rosiland Wihongi is a taekwando practitioner from New Zealand.

She represented New Zealand at the 2004 Summer Olympics at Athens.

External links 
Verina Wihongi at the NZOC website

References 
 Black Gold by Ron Palenski (2008, 2004 New Zealand Sports Hall of Fame, Dunedin) p. 96 

New Zealand female taekwondo practitioners
Taekwondo practitioners at the 2004 Summer Olympics
Olympic taekwondo practitioners of New Zealand
Living people
1978 births
21st-century New Zealand women